Verrecchie is a frazione of Cappadocia, in the Province of L'Aquila in the Abruzzo, region of Italy.

Frazioni of Cappadocia, Abruzzo